Salvador Dali's Tarot is a book by Rachel Pollack published in 1985.

Contents
Salvador Dali's Tarot is a book about the 78 paintings of Dalí's personal Tarot pack, each of which is reproduced in color on its own page.

Reception
Dave Langford reviewed Salvador Dali's Tarot for White Dwarf #71, and stated that "I have no faith in fortune-telling, but the cabalistic symbolism is fascinating ... especially when refracted through the eye of a supremely dotty surrealist."

References

1985 books
Salvador Dalí
Tarot